The 2018 Blind Cricket World Cup was the fifth Blind Cricket World Cup tournament, and was held from 8–20 January 2018 in Pakistan and the United Arab Emirates. In the final, defending champions India defeated Pakistan by 2 wickets to secure their 2nd Blind Cricket World Cup title under the captaincy of Ajay Kumar Reddy. Six teams, Pakistan, India, Sri Lanka, Bangladesh, Australia and Nepal played in the tournament, with Nepal making their first ever appearance.

India played all of their group stage matches of the tournament at neutral venues in the United Arab Emirates, after the foreign ministry of India blocked them from travelling to Pakistan. It was later revealed that the Cricket Association for the Blind in India and Pakistan Blind Cricket Council had agreed to shift the Indian matches to the UAE. Thus, only Nepal and Bangladesh were willing to play matches in Pakistan.

Initially, Pakistan was selected as the main host nation to host the tournament, with the UAE later agreeing to host some of the matches. It was the first time that Pakistan had been selected to host the Blind Cricket World Cup since 2006, and marked the first instance where UAE also had hosted few matches as a part of the World Cup.

Sharjah Cricket Stadium hosted the final between India and Pakistan on 20 January; prior to the World Cup, Pakistan had originally been selected to host the final. India and Pakistan were the only teams to play against each other in the finals of the Blind Cricket World Cup on three consecutive occasions.

In the final, Pakistan batted first and managed to score 308/8 after being put into bat by India. India chased down the target of 309 with 16 balls to spare to clinch the title. India thus maintained their unbeaten record in the tournament.

Venues 
Gaddafi Stadium was the only venue to host the Blind Cricket World Cup matches in Pakistan. In the UAE,  International standard cricket venues including Ajman Oval were chosen to host some of the matches.

Group stage 
15 group league matches took place during the tournament.

1st Match

2nd Match

3rd Match

4th Match

5th Match

6th Match

7th Match

8th Match

9th Match

10th Match

11th Match

12th Match

13th Match

14th Match

15th Match

Semi finals

1st Semi final

2nd Semi final

Final

Broadcasting 
PTV Sports, the Premier 24 hour Pakistani sport channel was awarded the rights to host the 40 overs Blind Cricket World Cup tournament.

See also 
 Blind cricket
 2017 Blind T20 World Cup

References

External links 
2018 Blind Cricket World Cup schedule

2018 in Australian cricket
2018 in Bangladeshi cricket
2018 in Indian cricket
2018 in Nepalese sport
2018 in Pakistani cricket
2018 in Emirati cricket
2018 in Sri Lankan cricket
Blind cricket
Parasports in India
Parasports in Pakistan
International cricket competitions in 2017–18